The 2018–19 Serie D was the seventy-first edition of the top level Italian non-professional football championship. It represents the fourth tier in the Italian football league system. A total of 168 teams, divided on geographical grounds into six groups of 18 teams each and three groups of 20 teams each.

Changes from 2017–18 
The 2018–19 Serie D season was one of the most competitive and prestigious in the league's history, due to the presence of several teams with longstanding history in the professional leagues, which were refounded after going bankrupt in 2018. These teams include former Serie A clubs Bari, Modena, Cesena, Avellino and Reggio Audace (formerly known as Reggiana).

Teams 
The composition of the league's nine groups was announced on 30 August 2018. Gozzano, Pro Patria, Virtus Verona, Rimini, Imolese, Albissola, Vis Pesaro, Rieti, Potenza, Cavese and Vibonese all depart Serie D, having been promoted to Serie C.

Teams relegated from Serie C 
Prato, Gavorrano and Santarcangelo joined the league, having been relegated from Serie C. 

Akragas was relegated from Serie C to Serie D, but the club did not register and was put into liquidation due to financial difficulties. Fondi was relegated from Serie C, but the club merged with F.C. Aprilia. Owner Antonio Pezone transferred Fondi's sporting title to Aprilia Racing, ending Fondi's existence. F.C. Aprilia played in Serie D the previous season and earned the right to return. The merged club took the name F.C. Aprilia Racing Club and registered with the league for the current season. After the end of the previous season, Mestre attempted to enroll in Serie C for 2018–19, at the last minute. However, anticipated new financial backers walked away, citing concerns over infrastructure, and the Serie C registration was rejected. Mestre was left with no better option but to play the 2018–19 season at the Eccellenza level.

Refounded former professional teams 
As part of the Article 52 of N.O.I.F. legislation, newborn clubs that explicitly represent the continuity of professional clubs who were excluded from their league can be admitted to Serie D under specific circumstances.

A record three Serie B clubs failed to register in the Italian second division for the new season and thus were readmitted as newborn clubs with different ownerships. Bari, probably the most successful one of the three, was refounded under new owner Aurelio De Laurentiis, president of Napoli after the original club renounced participation in Serie B due to financial issues. Cesena also voluntarily renounced registration at Serie B level. Since another club from Cesena, Romagna Centro, was already playing at Serie D level, it was forbidden for a newborn club to be founded and registered with the league. In order for Cesena to continue playing, Romagna Centro renamed itself A.S.D. Romagna Centro Cesena . Avellino was also excluded after losing an appeal regarding their exclusion from Serie B, and a newborn club was subsequently admitted to Serie D.

Other refounded teams admitted to Serie D include Modena, which started the 2017–18 season in Serie C but was excluded later on 6 November 2017, due to falling behind on bills, getting locked out of its stadium and missing four consecutive Serie C matches, because of its players being on strike after not being paid for several months, thus effectively dissolving the club and ending its 105-year history. A refounded version of the club, named Modena FC 2018, was allowed to join the Serie D as a phoenix club.

After the 2017–18 season, Reggiana failed to register the team in 2018–19 Serie C, after an unsuccessful attempt by owner Mike Piazza to sell a majority interest in the debt-ridden club. Reggio Audace F.C. enters Serie D as a reincarnation of A.C. Reggiana 1919.

Following the 2017–18 season, Vicenza Calcio merged with Bassano Virtus 55 S.T. with the merged club playing as L.R. Vicenza Virtus and retaining the sporting title of Bassano Virtus, resulting in the loss of Vicenza's sporting title and the dissolution of the club. A newly formed company, A.C. Vicenza 1902, requested the sporting title of Vicenza Calcio and entry into Serie D. Both requests were rejected by the Italian Football Federation, which said the club could only apply to play in Terza Categoria.

Fidelis Andria was denied registration for the 2018–19 Serie C, based on Covisoc's assessment of the club's debt situation. On the date of the deadline for Serie D registration, a group of investors led by Marco Di Vincenzo formed S.S.D. Fidelis Andria 1928 as a reincarnation of S.S. Fidelis Andria 1928 and to assume the former club's sporting title. The reborn club was admitted to Serie D.

Teams promoted from Eccellenza 
Real Giulianova, Rotonda, Locri, Castrovillari, Savoia, Sorrento, Nola, Axys Zola, Savignanese, Classe, Chions, Vis Artena, Città di Anagni, Ladispoli, Fezzanese, Fanfulla, Sondrio, Adrense, Villa d'Almè, Calvina Sport, Montegiorgio, Isernia, Stresa, Pro Dronero, Città di Fasano, Castiadas, Torres, Marsala, Città di Messina, Sangimignano, Aglianese, Sinalunghese, Virtus Bolzano, St. Georgen, Bastia, Cannara, Cartigliano, Sandonà and Villafranca joined Serie D after earning promotion from Eccellenza.

Teams relegated to Eccellenza 
Varesina, Varese Calcio, Derthona, Castellazzo Bormida, Lumezzane, Grumellese, Dro Alto Garda, Romanese, Montebelluna, Calvi Noale, Liventina, Abano, Castelvetro, Vivi Altotevere Sansepolcro, Correggese, Colligiana, Rignanese, Finale, Argentina, Valdinievole Montecatini, Jesina, Monticelli, Fabriano Cerreto, Nerostellati, Nuorese, Anziolavinio, Tortoli, San Teodoro, San Severo, Aversa Normanna, Manfredonia, Sporting Fulgor Molfetta, Ebolitana, Palazzolo, Paceco and Isola Capo Rizzuto departed Serie D after being relegated to Eccellenza.

Previous season's team not returning 
Villabiagio participated in Serie D during the previous season and earned the right to return for this season, but the club did not register to play.

Merger 
Nerostellati Frattese merged with Ercolanese and the combined organization played under the Ercolanese name. San Nicolò merged into Notaresco. Newly promoted Omnia Bitonto merged into Bitonto.

Girone A

League table

Girone B

League table

Girone C

League table

Girone D

League table

Girone E

League table

Girone F

League table

Girone G

League table

Girone H

League table

Girone I

League table

Scudetto Serie D
The nine group winners enter a tournament which determines the overall Serie D champions and the winner is awarded the Scudetto Serie D.

First round
division winners placed into 3 groups of 3
group winners and best second-placed team qualify for semi-finals
rank in Discipline Cup and head-to-head will break a tie or ties in points for the top position in a group

Semi-finals
On neutral ground.

Final
On neutral ground.

''Scudetto winners: Avellino

References

4
Serie D seasons
Italy